Hassi Khébi is a village in the commune of Oum El Assel, in Tindouf Province, Algeria. It is located on the N50 national highway between Béchar and Tindouf.

References

Neighbouring towns and cities

Populated places in Tindouf Province
Villages in Algeria